Butoconazole (trade names Gynazole-1, Mycelex-3) is an imidazole antifungal used in gynecology. It is administered as a vaginal cream.

References

External links 
 

Chloroarenes
Thioethers
Imidazole antifungals
Lanosterol 14α-demethylase inhibitors